Rolls is a Finnish chain of hamburger fast food restaurants. Founded in 1988, the company has around one hundred restaurants throughout the country.

See also
 List of hamburger restaurants

References 

Fast-food franchises
Fast-food hamburger restaurants
Regional restaurant chains
Restaurants established in 1988
Fast-food chains of Finland